Kasmiro Omona (born 27 July 1963) is a Ugandan boxer. He competed in the men's welterweight event at the 1988 Summer Olympics.

References

1963 births
Living people
Ugandan male boxers
Olympic boxers of Uganda
Boxers at the 1988 Summer Olympics
Place of birth missing (living people)
Welterweight boxers